Ann Arbor Huron High School, or Huron High School (HHS), is a public high school located in Ann Arbor, MI, in the U.S.  The school is part of the Ann Arbor Public Schools district.  Located at 2727 Fuller Road in eastern Ann Arbor near the banks of the Huron River, it serves grades 9 through 12.  Huron is one of the three main public high schools in Ann Arbor (along with Pioneer High School and Skyline High School). Newsweek named the school one of America's Best High Schools in 2012, and it was awarded Best Overall Academic Performance in Michigan by BusinessWeek in 2009 and 2010.

The school is shaped like an "H" with two convex wings adjoined by a two floor archway that has become a distinguishing feature of the building. Huron is a Division I member of the Michigan High School Athletic Association (MHSAA) for athletic competition. The school offers 50 different sports comprising 32 varsity level teams, several of them frequently crowned state champions.

History

Huron High School opened in September 1969. Prior to Huron's opening, the student body at the city's only other public high school, Ann Arbor High, experienced overcrowding. In 1967-68 and 1968-69, before Huron's building was completed, eastside students who were to be designated to the new school shared the Pioneer building in a split schedule. Pioneer students attended classes in the morning from 7:30 A.M. to 12:30 P.M. and Huron students in the afternoon from 1 P.M. to 6 P.M, despite petitions from Huron students to the Board of Education for them to attend school in the morning.

Due to delays from construction strikes and other issues the planned opening date was pushed back two years from 1967 to 1969.  In July 1969, Paul K. Meyers, the first principal of Huron High School, and assistant principal Albert Gallup and staff moved in.

When Huron opened, the school board deliberated over what the new high school would be named. After a poll was taken among the school community to determine the name, "River Rats" was suggested as a write-in option. Despite opposition from the school board, the "River Rat" name maintained popularity among students. The press began using the term "River Rats" and eventually the name stuck.

From 1969 to 1979, Paul K. Meyers served as principal, and was succeeded by Ronald Tesch. His goal was to revive and enhance the cooperation and communication between the school faculty and student body. He left the position in 1986, and from 1986 to 1987, Al Gallup served as interim principal. In 1987, Huron saw Dr. Joetta Mial begin her tenure as principal, which she served as until 1993. In 1988, the Ann Arbor Board of Education passed a $31 million renovation and construction program. From 1988 to 1991, Huron underwent major renovations in which library and lunchrooms were expanded, and a band room, science and math wings were added. The athletic wing was also added and included a new pool and gym. Huron's dome gym and athletic department were constructed during these renovations. On May 12, 1993, the auditorium was dedicated to Paul K. Meyers.

After Dr. Joetta Mial's departure, from 1993 to 1994, Jane Johnson served as interim principal. In 1994, Dr. Arthur Williams began his tenure at Huron, and was a strong advocate for reforms. He retired in 2014, after serving as principal for 20 years; he has become Huron's longest-serving principal. From the 2014-2015 school year, Jennifer Hein began serving as principal.
 
Overcrowding became an issue again. Portables were used to house classes outside of the main building. In 2008 Skyline High School was opened and slowly branched off the existing two, starting with only a freshman class.

The movie Jumper was filmed on location at Huron High School and neighboring Gallup Park in February 2007. One hundred students were chosen from Huron to be extras for the movie. The screenplay of Jumper was written by Huron High School graduate David S. Goyer and was released in February 2008.

Academics

As of the 2015-16 school year, IB courses are being offered.

Extracurricular activities

Athletics
Huron High School is a member of the Michigan High School Athletic Association (MHSAA).  Huron joined the Southeastern Conference "SEC" in the 2007-2008 school year.

The Huron athletic program offers the following sports:

Boys: baseball, basketball, cross country, football, golf, hockey, lacrosse, soccer, swimming & diving, tennis, track and field, water polo, and wrestling
Girls: basketball, cross country, field hockey, golf, lacrosse, soccer, softball, swimming & diving, synchronized swimming, tennis, track and field, volleyball, water polo, and cheerleading
Coed: equestrian, crew, bowling, athletic training, and figure skating

Publications
 The Enthymion: the school yearbook
 The Emery: the school newspaper. Beginning in 2009 The Emery began expanding online as well as maintaining its regular paper publication.
 Full Circle: the school's annually-published literary magazine. The publication contains student-submitted poetry, prose, and artwork.

Notable alumni

Sports
Zeke Jones (1985): silver medalist in wrestling at the 1992 Summer Olympics
James "Lights Out" Toney (1986): professional boxer 
Annette Salmeen (1992): gold medalist in swimming at 1996 Summer Olympics
Andy Hilbert (1999): NHL left wing, New York Islanders
Elizabeth Armstrong (2001): member of United States women's national water polo team
Evan Bates (2007): ice dancer, 2015 national champion 
Nathan Gerbe (2005): NHL player for the Columbus Blue Jackets, finalist for the 2007-08 Hobey Baker Award
Patrick Kane (2006): NHL player for Chicago Blackhawks, 3-time Stanley Cup Champion
Alex Shibutani (2009): ice dancer, 2018 Olympic Bronze medalist, 2016 and 2017 national champion, 2010 U.S. Junior national champion
Maia Shibutani (2012): ice dancer, 2018 Olympic Bronze medalist, 2016 and 2017 national champion, 2010 U.S. Junior national champion

Music and entertainment
David S. Goyer (1984): screenwriter, director and producer 
Lloyd Dangle (1979); visual artist and cartoonist 
Javier Grillo-Marxuach (1987): screenwriter, producer of television series Lost 
Ryan Drummond (1990): actor, singer 
Cherry Chevapravatdumrong (1995): author, executive story editor and co-producer of Family Guy
Andy Wood (1995): standup comedian, co-founder of Bridgetown Comedy Festival in Portland, OR.
Mayer Hawthorne (1997): singer, producer, songwriter, DJ, rapper and musician 
Michael Kosta (1998): Stand-up Comedian, Daily Show Correspondent and Other TV Hosting Credentials.  
Jack Falahee (2007): actor known for role as Connor Walsh in ABC's How to Get Away with Murder

Media and literature
Susan Goldberg (1977?): journalist, editor-in-chief of National Geographic magazine
 Jay Nordlinger (1982): editor at the National Review 
 John Pollack (1984): author, Presidential speech writer 
 Julie Orringer (1989): author, How To Breathe Underwater and others 
 Jill Carroll (1995): journalist; 2006 kidnapping victim in Iraq 
 Angel Nafis (2006): poet

Other
Thomas Knoll (1978): co-creator of Adobe Photoshop
John Knoll (1980): co-creator of Adobe Photoshop, visual effects guru 
Laurie McNeil (1973): physicist

References

External links

High schools in Ann Arbor, Michigan
Educational institutions established in 1969
Ann Arbor Public Schools
Public high schools in Michigan
1969 establishments in Michigan